Holocerina is a genus of moths in the family Saturniidae. The genus was first described by Pinhey in 1956.

Species
Holocerina agomensis (Karsch, 1893)
Holocerina angulata (Aurivillius, 1893)
Holocerina digennariana Darge, 2008
Holocerina guineensis (Strand, 1912)
Holocerina intermedia Rougeot, 1978
Holocerina istsariensis Stoneham, 1962
Holocerina menieri Rougeot, 1973
Holocerina micropteryx (Hering, 1949)
Holocerina nilotica (Jordan, 1922)
Holocerina occidentalis Bouyer, 2008
Holocerina orientalis Bouyer, 2001
Holocerina prosti Rougeot, 1978
Holocerina rhodesiensis (Janse, 1918)
Holocerina rougeoti Bouyer, 1997
Holocerina smilax (Westwood, 1849)
Holocerina wensis Rougerie & J. Bouyer, 2005

References

Saturniinae